Pak Khlong railway station is a railway station located in Makok Nua Subdistrict, Khuan Khanun District, Phatthalung.

Train services 
 Rapid No.169/170 Bangkok-Yala-Bangkok
 Local No. 445/446 Chumphon-Hat Yai Junction-Chumphon
 Local No. 447/448 Surat Thani-Sungai Kolok-Surat Thani
 Local No. 451/452 Nakhon Si Thammarat-Sungai Kolok-Nakhon Si Thammarat
 Local No. 455/456 Nakhon Si Thammarat-Yala-Nakhon Si Thammarat
 Local No. 457/458 Nakhon Si Thammarat-Phatthalung-Nakhon Si Thammarat (Terminated since 1 October 2015)

References 
 
 

Railway stations in Thailand